USS Kent Island (AG-78/AKS-26) was a Belle Isle-class miscellaneous auxiliary acquired by the U.S. Navy shortly before the end of World War II. She was used to transport personnel and cargo and was inactivated and disposed of shortly after the war.

Constructed at Portland, Maine
Kent Island (AG-78) was launched 9 January 1945 by New England Shipbuilding Corporation, South Portland, Maine, under a U.S. Maritime Commission contract; sponsored by Mrs. Nan Hatch; transferred to the Navy 19 January 1945; commissioned the same day, ferried to Todd Shipbuilding Company, Hoboken, New Jersey; decommissioned 23 January 1945 for conversion to a barracks and issue ship; and recommissioned 1 August 1945.

World War II-related service
After shakedown in the Chesapeake Bay, Kent Island cleared Norfolk, Virginia, 31 August for duty with the Service Force Pacific Fleet. She arrived Pearl Harbor 9 October via San Diego, California, to commence operations in Hawaiian waters.

She sailed for Okinawa 17 October to receive Navy veterans for transportation to the United States, and returned San Francisco, California, 30 November. Kent Island cleared San Francisco 3 January 1946, transited the Panama Canal, and arrived Hampton Roads 26 January.

Inactivation
Following upkeep, she put into Orange, Texas, 15 March where she was placed out of commission in reserve 22 June 1946. She was redesignated AKS-26 on 18 August 1951 and struck from the Navy List 1 April 1960. Kent Island was sold to Southern Scrap Material Co. 2 November 1960 to be scrapped.

References
  
 NavSource Online: Service Ship Photo Archive - AG-78 / AKS- 26 Kent Island

 

Basilan-class auxiliary ships
Ships built in Portland, Maine
1945 ships
World War II auxiliary ships of the United States
Liberty ships